Holley is an unincorporated community and census-designated place in Santa Rosa County, Florida, United States. Its population was 1,630 as of the 2010 census. Florida State Road 87 passes through the community.

For almost all cases, the community of Holley, is considered to be a neighborhood or character area of the larger community of Navarre, Florida. This includes the community of Holley being included in the federally designated Holley-Navarre Census County Division, being served by the Holley-Navarre Fire District and Holley-Navarre Water System, and being included in the county election precinct exclusively designated for Navarre. Major neighborhoods in Holley include Holley Village, Muddy Ford, Harper, and Miller Point.

Geography

References

Unincorporated communities in Santa Rosa County, Florida
Unincorporated communities in Florida
Census-designated places in Santa Rosa County, Florida
Census-designated places in Florida
Navarre, Florida